A Norwich Pharmacal order is a court order for the disclosure of documents or information that is available in the United Kingdom and Ireland. It is granted against a third party which has been innocently mixed up in wrongdoing, forcing the disclosure of documents or information. By identifying individuals the documents and information sought are disclosed in order to assist the applicant for such an order in bringing legal proceedings against individuals who are believed to have wronged the applicant.

A Norwich Pharmacal order was first granted in 1974 by the House of Lords in Norwich Pharmacal Co. v Customs and Excise Commissioners, a case concerning the alleged violation of a patent by unknown importers of the chemical subject to the patent. While first developed in relation to intellectual property, Norwich Pharmacal orders are now granted in relation to other torts, including defamation, and breach of contract, as well as alleged criminal offences. More recently Norwich Pharmacal orders are used against Internet hosting services and Internet service providers to identify users which have allegedly engaged in wrongdoing.

In 2011, it was proposed that Norwich Pharmacal orders should not be granted by the UK courts where disclosure of the material in question would cause damage to the public interest. This was implemented in the Justice and Security Act 2013.

Principles of the Norwich Pharmacal jurisdiction
In Norwich Pharmacal Co. v Customs and Excise Commissioners, the House of Lords held that where an innocent third party has information relating to unlawful conduct, a court could compel them to assist the person suffering damage by giving them that information. The judgement is based on the 19th century procedure known as the "bill of discovery" and the case was brought by Norwich Pharmacal Co., the owner of the patent for a chemical. Norwich knew that its patent was infringed, because the chemical was imported into the UK, but it was unable to identify the alleged wrongdoer. It brought proceedings against HM Customs and Excise to force the Commissioners to disclose the names of the importers, which were the "Intended Defendants".

Norwich Pharmacal orders are typically sought when legal proceedings for alleged wrongdoing cannot be brought because the identity of the wrongdoer is not known. Parties which believe they have been wronged will apply for a Norwich Pharmacal order to the court against third parties who can identify the wrongdoer, because they unwittingly facilitate the wrongdoing. In the judgement granting the first Norwich Pharmacal order Lord Reid summarised the principle of the Norwich Pharmacal jurisdiction as follows:

An application for a Norwich Pharmacal order must be commenced against the facilitator by issuing a claim form. In the case of alleged tort an interim application must be made to a master in the Queen's Bench Division or the Chancery Division in the High Court of Justice. The Civil Procedure Rules (CPR) 31.17 outline the procedures of the Norwich Pharmacal jurisdiction in England and Wales. Norwich Pharmacal orders are not restricted to cases where such an order is a last resort – it is "intended to be a... flexible remedy."

The nature of the relief has been summarised thus:

Developments in case law

See also 
 Anton Piller order

References

Further reading
 
 
 
 
 

Judicial remedies
English law